The Hollanders River, a perennial river that is part of the Hawkesbury-Nepean catchment, is located in the Central Tablelands region of New South Wales, Australia.

Course and features
The Hollanders River rises within the Moorara Range, on the eastern slopes of the Great Dividing Range southeast of Edith, and flows generally south by west before reaching its confluence with the Kowmung River, near its junction with the Tuglow River, southeast of Shooters Hill. The river descends  over its  course.

See also 

 List of rivers of Australia
 List of rivers of New South Wales (A–K)
 Rivers of New South Wales

References 

Rivers of New South Wales
Central Tablelands